Rauwolscine, also known as isoyohimbine, α-yohimbine, and corynanthidine, is an alkaloid found in various species within the genera Rauvolfia and Corynanthe (including Pausinystalia). It is a stereoisomer of yohimbine. Rauwolscine is a central nervous system stimulant, a local anesthetic and a vague aphrodisiac.

Rauwolscine acts predominantly as a α2-adrenergic receptor antagonist. It has also been shown to function as a 5-HT1A receptor partial agonist and 5-HT2A and 5-HT2B receptor antagonist.

See also
 Ajmalicine
 Corynanthine
 Spegatrine
 Yohimbine

References

Indoloquinolizines
Tryptamine alkaloids
Quinolizidine alkaloids
Alkaloids found in Rauvolfia
Alpha-2 blockers
5-HT1A agonists
5-HT2A antagonists
5-HT2B antagonists
Methyl esters